Halehomaha is an unincorporated community on the island of Kauai in Kauai County, Hawaii, United States. The community is located on the Pacific Ocean on the north shore of the island and is directly north of Ha'ena State Park. Halehomaha is served by Hawaii Route 560.

References

Populated places on Kauai
Unincorporated communities in Kauai County, Hawaii
Unincorporated communities in Hawaii
Populated coastal places in Hawaii